Aldo Baldin (1 January 1945 - 5 January 1994) was a Brazilian opera and concert-hall tenor. His recordings include a number of Bach cantatas.

Life
Born in Urussanga, Santa Catarina, he was taught singing and cello by Heloisa Nemoto Vergara and Jean-Jacques Pagnot at the Escola Superior de Música da UFRGS in Porto Alegre. He graduated in vocal studies alongside Roberto Miranda and Eliane Sampaio from the Universidade Federal do Rio de Janeiro.

Supported by the conductor Karl Richter and a scholarship from DAAD, he continued his singing training at the Musikhochschule Frankfurt in Germany under Martin Gründler. He also trained in Berlin under Margarethe von Winterfeldt and in Paris. He made his debut at the Pfalztheater in Kaiserslautern in 1975, at the Teatro Colón in Buenos Aires in 1980 and at the Scala in Milan in 1981. Among other institutions, he taught at the music academies in Blumenau in Brazil and in Heidelberg, Mannheim and Karlsruhe in Germany. He died in Waldbronn at the age of 49.

Discography
 Johann Sebastian Bach: several cantatas (mainly under Helmuth Rilling, Bach-Collegium Stuttgart), Edition Bachakademie
 Gaetano Donizetti: Messa da Requiem (Miguel Angel Gomez Martinez, Bamberger Symphoniker), Orfeo
 Joseph Haydn: The Creation (Neville Marriner, Academy of St. Martin in the Fields), Philips
 Wolfgang Amadeus Mozart: Le nozze di Figaro (Neville Marriner, Academy of St. Martin in the Fields), Philips

References

External links 
 
 

20th-century Brazilian male opera singers
Brazilian operatic tenors
1945 births
1994 deaths
Federal University of Rio de Janeiro alumni